T. vermicularis may refer to:
 Takifugu vermicularis, the vermiculated puffer, a fish species found in Korea
 Thamnolia vermicularis, a fungus species associated in lichens in the genus Thamnolia found in high parts of Namadgi National Park in the Australian Capital Territory and Severnaya Zemlya
 Typhlops vermicularis, the European blind snake or worm snake, a reptile species found in Europe and Lebanon

See also
 Vermicularis (disambiguation)